Antoine Christophe Merlin (13 September 1762 in Thionville, Moselle – September 1833 in Paris) was a member of several legislative bodies during the era of the French Revolution.  He is usually called Merlin de Thionville (Merlin of Thionville) to distinguish him from Philippe-Antoine Merlin de Douai.

Life
He was born at Thionville, the son of a procureur in the bailliage of Thionville.  After studying theology, he began a career in law, and in 1788 was an avocat at the parlement of Metz. In 1790 he was elected municipal officer of Thionville, and was sent by the department of Moselle to the Legislative Assembly. On 23 October 1791 he moved and carried the institution of a committee of surveillance, of which he became a member. It was he who proposed the law sequestrating the property of the émigrés, and he took an important part in the Demonstration of 20 June 1792 and in the revolution of 10 August of the same year.

He was elected deputy to the National Convention, and pressed for the execution of Louis XVI, but a mission to the army prevented his attending the trial. He displayed great bravery in the defence of Mainz. He took part in the Thermidorian Reaction which followed the fall of Robespierre, and was appointed to the Committee of General Security on 31 July 1794. He sat in the Council of Five Hundred under the Directory, and at the Coup of 18 Fructidor (4 September 1797) demanded the deportation of certain republican members.  In 1798 he ceased to be a member of the Council of Five Hundred, and was appointed director-general of posts, being sent subsequently to organize the Army of Italy. He retired into private life at the proclamation of the Consulate, and lived in retirement under the Consulate and the First French Empire.

See also
 The Legislative Assembly and the fall of the French monarchy

References

Attribution

 The 1911 Encyclopædia Britannica gives as its reference J. Reynaud,  (Paris, 1860).

1762 births
1833 deaths
People from Thionville
People of the French Revolution
Burials at Père Lachaise Cemetery
Deputies to the French National Convention